Events in the year 955 in Norway.

Incumbents
Monarch: Haakon I Haraldsson

Events
Battle of Rastarkalv.

Arts and literature

Births

Deaths

Norway